Silent Cinema in India - A Pictorial Journey is a 2012 Indian English language non-fiction book, written by B D Garga and published by HarperCollins India.
 It won the 2012 National Film Award for Best Book on Cinema

References 

2012 non-fiction books
English-language books
HarperCollins books
Best Book on Cinema National Film Award winners
Indian non-fiction books
21st-century Indian books